Micromidia atrifrons is a species of dragonfly in the family Austrocorduliidae,
known as the Forest mosquitohawk. 
It is a small to medium-sized, black to metallic green dragonfly with pale markings on its abdomen,
endemic to north-eastern Australia,
where it inhabits streams.

Gallery

Note
There is uncertainty about which family Micromidia atrifrons best belongs to: Austrocorduliidae, Synthemistidae, or Corduliidae.

See also
 List of Odonata species of Australia

References

Austrocorduliidae
Odonata of Australia
Endemic fauna of Australia
Taxa named by Robert McLachlan (entomologist)
Insects described in 1883